Campiglossa scedelloides is a species of tephritid or fruit flies in the genus Campiglossa of the family Tephritidae.

Distribution
The species is found in Kazakhstan, Kyrgyzstan, Uzbekistan, Mongolia.

References

Tephritinae
Insects described in 1990
Diptera of Asia